Charles Heywood, nicknamed "Dobie", was an American Negro league pitcher in the 1920s.

Heywood made his Negro leagues debut in 1925 with the Lincoln Giants and played with the Giants again the following season.

References

External links
 and Seamheads

Year of birth missing
Year of death missing
Place of birth missing
Place of death missing
Lincoln Giants players
Baseball pitchers